No Redemption (Official DmC: Devil May Cry Soundtrack), sometimes simply referred to as "No Redemption", is a soundtrack album by American aggrotech band Combichrist, released on January 25, 2013. It presents a more metal-oriented direction than Combichrist is generally known for. Almost half the tracks were released on the DmC: Devil May Cry Soundtrack Selection.

Track listing
All songs written by Andy LaPlegua. 

 2, 5, 6, 7, 9, 12 and 13 were released on DmC: Devil May Cry Soundtrack Selection.

 1, 4, 6 and 8 were released on Making Monsters.
 7 and 10 were released on Today We Are All Demons
 2, 3, 5 and 9 were released on What the Fuck Is Wrong with You People?

References

External links
 Combichrist website

2013 soundtrack albums
Combichrist albums
Devil May Cry